Le Boreal is a cruise ship owned and operated by the French cruise line company Compagnie du Ponant.

It cruises to Antarctica and other places.

Design and description

Construction and career
Le Boreal entered service on 6 May 2010.

Between 25 February and 6 March 2018, video journalist and podcaster Brady Haran conducted an expedition to Antarctica aboard this vessel.

2015 engine room fire 
On 18 November 2015 Le Boreal suffered a major engine room fire which caused the loss of all power and left her drifting. The captain ordered the ship, with 347 passengers and crew, to be abandoned early in the morning. A distress call was issued just after 2 a.m. while it was near Cape Dolphin, the northerly point of East Falkland, Falkland Islands. The news agency reported that 90 of the ship's 347 passengers and crew were air-lifted to safety from life rafts. The sister ship L'Austral responded to the distress call and took on some passengers.

Working closely with the Falkland Islands Government, British forces enacted a major search and rescue plan. Two Sea King Royal Air Force Search and Rescue helicopters were scrambled, along with two other support helicopters, a C-130 Hercules and a Voyager aircraft for command and control. The Royal Navy patrol vessel  was dispatched to the scene, as were two Dutch tugs which support British forces in the Falkland Islands. Subsequently, all passengers and crew from Le Boreal were accounted for and being looked after on the Falkland Islands. The vessel was later reported in a stable condition and the tugs were assisting to bring her alongside in the Falkland Islands for a detailed assessment of her condition.  In March 2016, Ponant confirmed that Le Boreal would resume service in May. The investigators' report was released in July 2016, and attributed the fire to a ship's officer's misidentification of a clogged fuel filter; the report noted that the officer did not have a mechanic's rating, and Ponant subsequently changed several work rules in response to the report.

In popular culture 
Le Boreal was featured in episode three of the fifth season of the TV series Mighty Ships. The ship was shown taking tourists to South Georgia and the Antarctic Peninsula.

References

Notes

Bibliography

External links

 Compagnie du Ponant official site page about the ship

Ships built in Ancona
Ships built by Fincantieri
Ships of Compagnie du Ponant
2010 ships